The , also called the  or the , is a Japanese uta monogatari that was written any time between the mid-Heian period to the early-Kamakura period. It is in one volume and consists of two distinct sections. The first section describes a young Ono no Takamura's tragic love affair with his half-sister. The second section is taken to be by a different author, and is dated somewhat later than the first. Both authors are unknown, and the poems attributed in the tale to Takamura are treated as dubious at best.

References

Further reading 

 
 
 Geddes, Ward. "Takamura Monogatari" IN Monumenta Nipponica. 1991. Tokyo : Sophia University.
 
 
 
 

Late Old Japanese texts
Monogatari